Motiganj railway station is a railway station on Lucknow–Gorakhpur line under the Lucknow NER railway division of North Eastern Railway zone. This is situated beside State Highway 30 at Motiganj in Gonda district in the Indian state of Uttar Pradesh.

References

Railway stations in Gonda district
Lucknow NER railway division